Francis Cleveland Irons (March 23, 1886 – June 19, 1942) was an American athlete who competed in the 1908 Summer Olympics and in the 1912 Summer Olympics. He was born in Des Moines, Iowa and died in Palatine, Illinois.

Irons competed for the United States in the 1908 Games held in London, Great Britain in the long jump where he won the gold medal. In the standing high jump event he finished eighth and in the triple jump competition he finished 16th. He also participated in the standing long jump contest but his result is unknown.

Four years later he finished ninth in the long jump competition at the 1912 Games. At this Olympics he also competed in the exhibition baseball tournament.

References

External links
 

1886 births
1942 deaths
Sportspeople from Des Moines, Iowa
American male long jumpers
American male high jumpers
American male triple jumpers
Baseball players from Iowa
Olympic baseball players of the United States
Athletes (track and field) at the 1908 Summer Olympics
Athletes (track and field) at the 1912 Summer Olympics
Baseball players at the 1912 Summer Olympics
Olympic gold medalists for the United States in track and field
Medalists at the 1908 Summer Olympics